Hoodwort is a common name for several plants and may refer to:

Scutellaria galericulata
Scutellaria lateriflora, native to North America